Ethiopian Airlines Flight 604 was a scheduled Addis Ababa–Bahir Dar–Asmara flight in which the aircraft caught fire during a belly landing at Bahir Dar Airport, Bahir Dar, Ethiopia, on 15 September 1988.

Aircraft
The aircraft involved in the accident was a Boeing 737-260, registration ET-AJA, delivered new to Ethiopian Airlines. At the time of the accident, the aircraft was less than a year old.

Accident description
On , the aircraft was scheduled to operate the second leg of a domestic Addis Ababa–Bahir Dar–Asmara passenger service with 98 passengers and 6 crew members on board. Both engines of the aircraft ingested a flock of speckled pigeons as it took off from Bahir Dar Airport, and subsequently overheated. One of the engines immediately lost thrust, while the other did so on the emergency return to the departure airport. During a gear-up landing, the aircraft caught fire.

There is some discrepancy over the death toll depending upon the source, as this number is claimed to be 35 or 31. The discrepancy likely arose because four bodies could not be recovered. All of the fatalities were among the passengers.

See also

 Ethiopian Airlines accidents and incidents
Ural Airlines Flight 178 – 2019 accident after both engines failed following a bird strike shortly after takeoff
US Airways Flight 1549 – 2009 accident after both engines failed following a bird strike shortly after takeoff
Scandinavian Airlines Flight 751 - 1991 accident after both engines failed following ice ingestion shortly after takeoff
Eastern Air Lines Flight 375 – 1960 accident after the aircraft suffered a bird strike shortly after takeoff

References

Aviation accidents and incidents in 1988
Aviation accidents and incidents in Ethiopia
1988 in Ethiopia
Accidents and incidents involving the Boeing 737 Original
605
September 1988 events in Africa
Airliner accidents and incidents caused by bird strikes
Airliner accidents and incidents involving belly landings
1988 disasters in Ethiopia